Kevyn Ista (born 22 November 1984 in Auvelais) is a Belgian former professional road bicycle racer, who rode professionally between 2005 and 2020, for eight different teams. He now works as a directeur sportif for UCI Continental team .

Major results

2004
 1st Stage 4 Tour de la province de Namur
2005
 6th Bordeaux–Saintes
 7th Brussels–Ingooigem
2006
 1st Ronde van Vlaanderen U23
2007
 1st Zellik–Galmaarden
 1st Stage 2 Tour de la province de Namur
 2nd Overall Drie Zustersteden
 3rd Overall Le Triptyque des Monts et Châteaux
 4th Vlaamse Havenpijl
 7th Kattekoers
 7th Grand Prix de Wallonie
2008
 1st Route Adélie
 2nd Overall Tour du Poitou-Charentes
 2nd Le Samyn
 5th Les Boucles du Sud-Ardèche
 8th Paris–Bruxelles
 10th Grand Prix Pino Cerami
2009
 1st Stage 3 Tour Méditerranéen
 2nd Overall Driedaagse van West-Vlaanderen
 2nd Omloop Het Nieuwsblad
 4th Cholet-Pays de Loire
2010
 5th Grand Prix d'Isbergues
 6th Cholet-Pays de Loire
 6th Grand Prix de la Somme
 7th Grand Prix de Wallonie
 9th Trofeo Cala Millor
2011
 2nd Le Samyn
2012
 2nd Grand Prix Impanis-Van Petegem
 6th Gooikse Pijl
 8th Overall Tour de Wallonie
 9th Overall Tour of Norway
 10th Halle–Ingooigem
2015
 3rd Grand Prix de la ville de Nogent-sur-Oise
 5th Schaal Sels
 8th Circuit de Wallonie
2016
 5th Polynormande
 6th Druivenkoers Overijse
 7th Grand Prix Impanis-Van Petegem
 8th De Kustpijl
 10th Overall Ronde van Midden-Nederland
 10th Brussels Cycling Classic
2017
 6th Gooikse Pijl
 7th Overall Circuit des Ardennes
 8th Dwars door de Vlaamse Ardennen
2018
 5th Grote Prijs Stad Zottegem
 5th Schaal Sels
 7th Halle–Ingooigem
 7th Internationale Wielertrofee Jong Maar Moedig
 9th Omloop van het Houtland
2019
 9th Paris–Tours

References

External links

 

Kevyn Ista's profile on Cycling Base

Belgian male cyclists
1984 births
Living people
Cyclists from Namur (province)
People from Sambreville